Mohamed bin Yaacob (3 January 1926 – 8 September 2009) was a Malaysian politician who served as the 17th Menteri Besar (Chief Minister) of Kelantan from 1978 to 1990.

Honours
  : 
 Commander of the Order of Loyalty to the Crown of Malaysia (PSM) – Tan Sri (1988)
  : 
 Knight Grand Commander of the Order of the Crown of Kelantan (SPMK) – Dato'
  :
  Knight Commander of the Order of the Star of Hornbill Sarawak (DA) – Datuk Amar
  :
 Commander of the Order of Kinabalu (PGDK) – Datuk
  :
  Companion of the Order of the Crown of Terengganu (SMT)

See also
 1977 Kelantan Emergency

References 

Chief Ministers of Kelantan
1926 births
2009 deaths
People from Kelantan
Malaysian people of Malay descent
Malaysian Muslims
Members of the Dewan Negara
Members of the Dewan Rakyat
Members of the Kelantan State Legislative Assembly
Kelantan state executive councillors
Government ministers of Malaysia
United Malays National Organisation politicians
Presidents of the Dewan Negara
20th-century Malaysian judges
Members of Lincoln's Inn
Commanders of the Order of Loyalty to the Crown of Malaysia
Education ministers of Malaysia
Knights Commander of the Order of the Star of Hornbill Sarawak
Commanders of the Order of Kinabalu